Fore Wood is a  biological Site of Special Scientific Interest north-west of Hastings in East Sussex. It is part of the Royal Society for the Protection of Birds nature reserve of the same name.

The woodland in this steep valley is variable and it has been considerably modified in some areas. Flora include hay-scented buckler-fern, greater wood-rush and hard fern, as well as  three rare mosses. There is also a rich community of breeding birds.

References

Sites of Special Scientific Interest in East Sussex
Royal Society for the Protection of Birds reserves in England